Optimism is an attitude for outcomes to be positive, favorable, desirable.

Optimism may also refer to:

 OPTIMISM ("operational Perseverance twin for integration of mechanisms and instruments sent to Mars"), an engineering model of the NASA-JPL 2020 Mars rover Perseverance, used as a test and problem solving vehicle on Earth for Mars
 New Optimism, a stagename of Japanese musician Miho Hatori
 Candide, or Optimism (aka: Optimism, Canadide), a satire by Voltaire
 Optimism Monthly Magazine (1995-2009) Czech literary magazine
 Optimism Press, an imprint of Penguin Random House founded by Simon Sinek
 "Optimism" (song), a 1974 song from the album Lady June's Linguistic Leprosy
 "Optimism" (song), a 2020 song by 'Spanish Loves Songs' off the album Brave Faces Everyone
 "Optimism" (episode), a 2018 episode of the TV series Supernatural in season 14
 "Optimism" (essay), an essay by Helen Keller

See also

 Candide, or Optimism Part II
 
 
 Optimist (disambiguation)
 Optimistic (disambiguation)
 Optimization (disambiguation)
 Optimum (disambiguation)